ALFRED (Advanced Lead-cooled Fast Reactor European Demonstrator) is a planned lead-cooled fast reactor. Designed by Ansaldo Energia from Italy, it represents the last stage of the ELSY and LEADER projects.

Construction 
ALFRED will be built in the Romanian town of Mioveni near Pitesti.

Technical data 
 Thermal power: 300 MW
 Electrical power: 125 MW
 Spectrum: Fast
 Coolant: Lead
 Average lead coolant temperature:  on entry,  on exit of the steam generator.
 Fuel: MOX

See also 
Fast breeder reactor
Fast neutron reactor
Generation IV reactor

References 

Liquid metal fast reactors
Nuclear power reactor types
Nuclear reactors
Nuclear research reactors
Small modular reactor